Real Gay is a 2005 gay-themed "reunion show" hosted by Kim Coles. Airing on the LGBT network Logo, Real Gay featured cast members from a number of different reality television series discussing their experiences being openly gay in the spotlight of national television.

Participants
Among those appearing on Real Gay were:

 Chip Arndt from The Amazing Race 4
 Lynn Warren and Alex Ali from The Amazing Race 7
 Will Wikle from Big Brother 5
 William Hernandez from The Real World: Philadelphia
 Genesis Moss from The Real World: Boston
 Ebony Haith from America's Next Top Model
 James Getzlaff from Boy Meets Boy
 Scout Cloud Lee from Survivor: Vanuatu
 Coby Archa from Survivor: Palau
 Jim Verraros from American Idol
 Brandon Kindle and Ryan Pacchiano from Showdog Moms & Dads
 Sophia Pasquis from Road Rules: The Quest
 Michelle Deighton from America's Next Top Model, Cycle 4

External links
 Real Gay on Logo

2005 television specials
LGBT-related television specials
Logo TV original programming